The Maryland Film Festival is an annual five-day international film festival taking place each May in Baltimore, Maryland. The festival was launched in 1999, and presents international film and video work of all lengths and genres. The festival is known for its close relationship with John Waters, who is on the festival's board of directors and selects a favorite film to host within each year of the festival.

Each U.S. feature screened within the festival is hosted by one or more of its filmmakers. The many internationally known filmmakers who have presented their work within Maryland Film Festival include Barry Levinson, David Simon, Kathryn Bigelow, Melvin Van Peebles, Lena Dunham, Lisandro Alonso, Bobcat Goldthwait, Amy Seimetz, David Lowery, Joe Swanberg, Greta Gerwig, Barry Jenkins, Todd Solondz, Anna Biller, and Jonathan Demme.

In addition to forty or more new features and fifty or more new short films, each Maryland Film Festival includes one favorite film selected and hosted by legendary filmmaker and MFF board member John Waters.  The films presented by John Waters within Maryland Film Festival have ranged from Joseph Losey's Boom! to Gaspar Noé's I Stand Alone.

Major names in contemporary music have presented favorite films within the festival, including Beach House, Dan Deacon, Branford Marsalis, Marin Alsop, Ian MacKaye, Will Oldham, Jonathan Richman, Bill Callahan, and members of Animal Collective.

Additionally, personalities ranging from Harry Belafonte to Cal Ripken Jr. have appeared at the festival alongside documentaries about their lives and work.

Each festival also includes a silent film with a live score by Alloy Orchestra.

The festival also programs film events in and around Baltimore year-round, including the film component of Baltimore's annual summer Artscape festival and many events for its membership support group Friends of the Festival.

The 18th annual festival took place May 4–8, 2016 using 5 screens in and around the Station North Arts and Entertainment District as well as the auditoriums of the Baltimore Museum of Art and Walters Art Museum.

The 19th annual festival took place May 4–7, 2017 using the 3 screens of the newly restored and expanded Parkway Theatre as well as three additional screens on the nearby Maryland Institute College of Art (MICA) campus.

Festival history

The first Maryland Film Festival screening took place Thursday, April 22, 1999, with an Opening Night presentation of Barry Levinson's documentary Diner Guys (about the real-life inspirations for his first feature film, Diner) at the historic Senator Theatre.

Full programming began April 23, 1999, using all five screens of the historic Charles Theatre. These screenings were the first public use of the newly renovated Charles, which had expanded from one to five screens.

In 2002, the festival dedicated its Opening Night to a collection of short films, and has done so each year since 2004.

In 2009, the festival expanded its offerings of international films, with the stated goal of expanding the scope of international films brought to Baltimore, and in future years bringing a filmmaker to host each foreign feature film screening as the festival does with all U.S.-made feature films.

In 2013, the festival announced its expansion to 5 days, shifting its Opening Night to Wednesday, May 8, 2013. Previous festivals had been 4 days, with opening nights taking place on Thursdays. The festival continued as a 5-day festival in each subsequent edition.

The festival's feature-film programming has emphasized independent films represented by their filmmakers, as well as international works handled by such art-house and specialty film distributors as The Cinema Guild, Oscilloscope Laboratories, Factory 25, Milestone Films, Strand Releasing, and Kino.

The festival has offered the world premieres of such American independent features as Eugene Kotlyarenko's 0s & 1s (2010), Josephine Decker's Butter on the Latch (2013), Stephen Cone's Henry Gamble's Birthday Party (2015), Josh Crockett's Dr. Brinks & Dr. Brinks (2017) and Stephen Cone's Princess Cyd (2017). The 2017 edition featured the U.S. premieres of Hugh Gibson's The Stairs and Ashley McKenzie's Werewolf.

The festival launched a year-round, 3-screen venue anchored by a historic, restored 1915 auditorium, The Parkway Theatre, in May 2017.

Longtime director of programming Eric Allen Hatch, who began working for MdFF in 2007, departed as lead programmer of Maryland Film Festival and The Parkway in February, 2018, citing creative differences detailed in a Filmmaker article concerning the need for greater risk-taking and attention to diversity in independent-film festivals and alternative venues.

The Parkway Theatre

In December 2013, the festival announced its plans to restore The Parkway Theatre, located at North Avenue and North Charles Street in the Station North Arts and Entertainment District, for use as its year-round venue. The Parkway was built for film exhibition in 1915, and became one of Baltimore's first art-house movie theaters in the 1950s, operating under the name Five West, but had not been in regular use as a movie theater since the late 1970s. Maryland Film Festival's restoration preserved the original auditorium, and built two smaller screens in an adjacent space.

The Parkway restoration project was completed in the Spring of 2017 and the theater opened on May 3, 2017, with the opening night of the 19th Annual Maryland Film Festival

The band Beach House shot the music video for their song "Chariots" in the historic auditorium of the Parkway in April, 2017 prior to the theater's public opening.

The first public screening in The Parkway was the Opening Night Shorts Program of the 2017 Maryland Film Festival on the evening of May 3, 2017, hosted by Josephine Decker and Kris Swanberg and the directors of each short film presented. The first short presented, and therefore the first film to play in The Parkway in decades, was Jessica Kingdon's Commodity City. The other shorts presented that evening were Terence Nance's They Charge For the Sun, Jeannie Donohoe's Game, Matthew Salton's Richard Twice, and Nathan Truesdell's Balloonfest.

The first feature film screened in the Parkway was Barry Levinson's television film The Wizard of Lies on the afternoon of Thursday, May 4, 2017. The first theatrical film screened in the Parkway was Theo Anthony's Rat Film the same evening. The first 35mm film screened in the Parkway was Agnès Varda's Vagabond, guest-curated and hosted by the band Beach House, on the evening of Saturday, May 6, 2017. These screenings all took place within Maryland Film Festival 2017.

The Parkway opened for year-round business on the evening of Friday, May 12. The first feature film screened in the Parkway in a non-festival setting was John Waters' Female Trouble. Other films screened that evening included David Lynch's Mulholland Drive, Jenny Gage's All This Panic, and Kristopher Avedisian's Donald Cried. The last two titles were the first films to have week-long theatrical runs at the restored Parkway.

The first live music performance in the restored Parkway was Alloy Orchestra's live score for the German silent film Variety within Maryland Film Festival 2017 on Sunday, May 7.

Outside the festival setting, members of the band Animal Collective curated live music performances in tribute to the late experimental musician Tony Conrad on the evenings of Friday, September 29 and Saturday September 30, 2017. The performers included Deakin and Geologist of Animal Collective, Dan Deacon with Jessie Hughes and M. C. (Martin) Schmidt of Matmos, Asa Osborne of Lungfish and Zomes, Owen Gardner and Andrew Bernstein of Horse Lords, Steve Strohmeier, and Daniel Conrad.

The first double feature at the Parkway, "Magic Mike Monday," took place October 2, 2017 with 35mm presentations of Magic Mike and Magic Mike XXL.

Closing night films

John Waters picks

Within every Maryland Film Festival since its launch in 1999, filmmaker and Maryland Film Festival board member John Waters has selected one film to present to an audience. His selections have ranged from vintage cult and camp titles to contemporary ribald comedies and art-house dramas.

Guest-host presentations
In addition to forty or more new features and a favorite film presented by John Waters, each Maryland Film Festival has invited guest-hosts to present a favorite film. Guest hosts have generally been known best for work outside the world of film and have frequently been musicians, but have also included politicians, athletes, authors, journalists, activists, and visual artists. The guest-host program has also included some film directors hosting revival screenings of their earlier works.

Alloy Orchestra presentations

A recurring highlight within each Maryland Film Festival since 2003 has been a silent film presented with Alloy Orchestra performing their new, original scores for these vintage films. Alloy Orchestra has also presented films at Maryland Film Festival stand-alone events throughout the year; this list is limited to presentations within the annual festival weekend.

Vintage 3-D film presentations

Beginning in 2002 and extending through 2012, each Maryland Film Festival presented a vintage 3D film in the two-projector 35mm format. Each screening was hosted by Baltimore Sun film writer Chris Kaltenbach.

List of features played at the festival

Each Maryland Film Festival has presented forty or more feature films, with the screenings of each U.S. film hosted by one of its filmmakers.

{| class="wikitable" border="1"
|-
! Year
! Films
|-
|-
| 1999
| Arlington Road, The Brandon Teena Story, The Cool World, Crime Wave, Divine Trash, Hands on a Hard Body, Lovers of the Arctic Circle, Mary Jane's Not a Virgin Anymore, My Son the Fanatic, Radiohead: Meeting People Is Easy, The Saltmen of Tibet, Without Limits
|-
|-
| 2000
| The Corner, Forbidden Zone, I Am Cuba, Kill by Inches, King Gimp, Panic, Paradise Lost 2: Revelations, Wattstax
|-
|-
| 2001
| The American Astronaut, Investigation of a Flame, Mutant Aliens, Plaster Caster, Portrait of Jason, Startup.com, Sun Ra: A Joyful Noise, Unfinished Symphony: Democracy and Dissent
|-
|-
| 2002
| Blue Vinyl, Charlotte Sometimes, Cyberman,  Derrida, The Execution of Wanda Jean, Freestyle: The Art of Rhyme, How to Draw a Bunny, Paperboys, Soft For Digging
|-
|-
| 2003
| BaadAsssss Cinema, Capturing the Friedmans, Funny Ha Ha, Horns and Halos, Hukkle, Irréversible, L'Auberge Espagnole, Melvin Goes to Dinner, The Mudge Boy, Stevie, Unprecedented
|-
|-
| 2004
| The Agronomist, BAADASSSSS!, Born into Brothels, High Tension, Imelda, Metallica: Some Kind of Monster, The Saddest Music in the World, Saved!, Travellers and Magicians, Word Wars
|-
|-
| 2005
| 9 Songs, The Aristocrats, The Boys of Baraka, The Edukators, Enron: The Smartest Guys in the Room, Mad Hot Ballroom, Me and You and Everyone We Know, Murderball, Mutual Appreciation, Palindromes, Street Fight
|-
|-
| 2006
| 12 and Holding, Darkon, Head-On, The Guatemalan Handshake, Hamilton, LOL, My Country, My Country, We Go Way Back
|-
| 2007
| Brand Upon the Brain!, Crazy Love, Frownland, Great World of Sound, Hannah Takes the Stairs, I Don't Want to Sleep Alone,  Killer of Sheep, The Last Days of Left Eye, Murder Party, My Nappy Roots, On a Tightrope, Quiet City, Silver Jew, Sleeping Dogs Lie, Syndromes and a Century, Viva, War/Dance, Zoo
|-
| 2008
| American Teen, At the Death House Door, Baghead, Bamako, Beautiful Losers, The Betrayal, Bi the Way, The Black List, Chop Shop, Goliath, Gonzo: The Life and Work of Dr. Hunter S. Thompson, I.O.U.S.A., Medicine for Melancholy, Momma's Man, My Effortless Brilliance, Nights and Weekends, Woodpecker
|-
| 2009
| Alexander the Last, The Beaches of Agnès, Beetle Queen Conquers Tokyo, Daytime Drinking, Garbage Dreams, Greek Pete, The Hurt Locker, Lake Tahoe, Make-out with Violence, Modern Love Is Automatic, Munyurangabo, Nollywood Babylon, Not Quite Hollywood, Stingray Sam, Treeless Mountain, World's Greatest Dad
|-
| 2010
| 12th & Delaware, And Everything Is Going Fine, Beijing Taxi, Casino Jack and the United States of Money, Cold Weather, Cyrus, Daddy Longlegs, Dogtooth, Freedom Riders, La Pivellina, Liverpool, Music by Prudence, Night Catches Us, The Oath, Putty Hill, Tiny Furniture, Until the Light Takes Us, Wheedle's Groove, Wuss
|-
|2011
| Better This World, The Catechism Cataclysm, The Color Wheel, The Dish & the Spoon, If a Tree Falls, The Interrupters, Last Days Here, Magic Trip, Meek's Cutoff,  My Joy,  Ne Change Rien,  Nostalgia for the Light, Restless City, Septien, Silver Bullets,  Terri, Uncle Boonmee Who Can Recall His Past Lives, A Useful Life, Viva Riva!, Weekend, We Were Here
|-
|2012
| Attenberg, Come Back, Africa, The Comedy, Compliance, Dark Horse, Ethel, Detropia, Gayby, God Bless America, Jeff,  Kid-Thing, Love Free Or Die, Lovely Molly, LUV, Once Upon a Time in Anatolia, Oslo, August 31st, The Patron Saints, Pilgrim Song, Porfirio, Reconvergence, Save the Date, The Source Family, Sun Don't Shine, Supporting Characters, Tchoupitoulas, This Is Not a Film, The Turin Horse, Under African Skies, V/H/S, Vito, Volcano, Wild in the Streets, Wuthering Heights
|-
|2013
| 12 O'Clock Boys, 16 Acres, Aatsinki, After Tiller, Augustine, Before You Know It, Berberian Sound Studio, Bluebird, Boy Eating the Bird's Food, Butter on the Latch, By and By, Computer Chess, Downloaded, Drinking Buddies, Fill the Void, Good Ol' Freda, Here Comes the Devil, Hit & Stay, I Am Divine, I Used to Be Darker, If We Shout Loud Enough, It Felt Like Love, Leviathan, Mother of George, Museum Hours, Paradise: Faith, Paradise: Hope, Paradise: Love, The Pervert's Guide to Ideology, Pit Stop, Post Tenebras Lux, Prince Avalanche, The Rambler, Remote Area Medical, Swim Little Fish Swim, A Teacher, This Is Martin Bonner, Touchy Feely, V/H/S/2, Watchtower, We Always Lie to Strangers, White Reindeer, Willow Creek, Zero Charisma
|-
|2014
| Abuse of Weakness, Actress, Approaching the Elephant, Appropriate Behavior, Art and Craft, The Auction, Baltimore in Black and White, Brewmore | Baltimore, Buzzard, Call Girl of Cthulhu, The Case Against 8, Celestial Wives of the Meadow Mari, Club Sandwich, Deep City: The Birth of the Miami Sound, Everybody Street, Evolution of a Criminal, Faults, Fight Church, Fort Tilden, Freedom Summer, Glena, Happy Christmas, Hellion, The Hip-Hop Fellow, I Play with the Phrase Each Other, Kumiko, the Treasure Hunter, Manakamana, The Mend, The Militant, Moebius, Obvious Child, Ping Pong Summer, Point and Shoot, September, Positive Force: More Than a Witness, The Strange Little Cat, Stray Dogs, Summer of Blood, Thou Wast Mild and Lovely, The Vanquishing of the Witch Baba Yaga, Water Like Stone, Welcome to Deathfest, Whitey: United States of America v. James J. Bulger, Who Took Johnny, Wild Canaries, Young Bodies Heal Quickly
|-
|2015
| 6 Years, Beats of the Antonov, Best of Enemies, The Black Panthers: Vanguard of the Revolution, Breaking a Monster, Call Me Lucky, Christmas, Again, Crocodile Gennadiy, Deep Web, Digging for Fire, Drunk Stoned Brilliant Dead, Entertainment, Field Niggas, For the Plasma, Frame by Frame, Funny Bunny, A Gay Girl in Damascus: The Amina Profile, Girlhood, God Bless the Child, Henry Gamble's Birthday Party, In the Basement, Jauja, Limbo, People, Places, Things, Prophet's Prey, The Reaper, Rebels of the Neon God, Results, Sailing a Sinking Sea, Stinking Heaven, Tab Hunter Confidential, Tired Moonlight, Two Shots Fired, Uncle Kent 2, Unexpected, Venice, Welcome to Leith, Western, The Wolfpack, A Wonderful Cloud|-
|2016
|Always Shine; The Apostate; Boone; Cameraperson; Cemetery of Splendor; Chevalier; collective:unconscious; Donald Cried; Do Not Resist; The Fits; Fraud; The Greasy Strangler; The Guys Next Door; He Hated Pigeons; High Rise; Hotel Dallas; How Heavy This Hammer; Hunter Gatherer, Ixcanul; Koza; Lamb; The Legend of Swee' Pea; Life, Animated; Little Men; Little Sister; Lovesong; The Love Witch; MA; The Master Cleanse; Morris From America; No Home Movie; Norman Lear: Just Another Version of You; Nuts!; Orange Sunshine; Salero; Shu-De!; Slash; A Stray; Trapped; Under the Shadow; Untouchable|-
|2017
|Austerlitz; Beach Rats; The Blood Is at the Doorstep; The Departure; Dr. Brinks & Dr. Brinks; Family Life; Finding Joseph I: The HR From Bad Brains Documentary; Golden Exits; Hermia & Helena; The Hero; The Human Surge; Intent to Destroy; Kékszakállú; Lemon; The Little Hours; Love After Love; Maineland; Mimosas; Motherland; Park; Person to Person; Princess Cyd; Rat Film; Roar; The Stairs; The Strange Ones; Sylvio; Tell Them We Are Rising; Thirst Street; Vagabond; Variety; Werewolf; Whose Streets?; The Wizard of Lies|}

Gunky's Basement Film series

Gunky’s Basement was a Maryland Film Festival series curated and hosted by musician Dan Deacon, video artist Jimmy Joe Roche, and MdFF programmer Eric Allen Hatch. Each title screened from a 35mm print and was promoted in part with original screenprinted posters created by Baltimore-based artists.

Gunky’s Basement was a year-round extension of the Maryland Film Festival Guest-Host program, in which a person best known for work outside the world of film selects and hosts a favorite film. Prior to Gunky’s Basement, Dan Deacon was a guest host in Maryland Film Festival 2010, selecting Total Recall.

The series originally took place in The Charles Theatre. Beginning with the July 12, 2017 screening of The Shining'', all Gunky's Basement screenings took place in Maryland Film Festival's year-round venue, The Parkway Theatre. The series came to a close when film curator Eric Allen Hatch departed MdFF in February, 2018.

Night Zones with Jimmy Joe Roche
As an offshoot of Gunky's Basement, Maryland Film Festival and video artist Jimmy Joe Roche partnered for a series exploring Roche's love of horror films. As with Gunky's Basement, each title screened from a 35mm print, and was promoted in part with original screenprinted posters created by a Baltimore artist.

External links 
 Official page for Maryland Film Festival
 The New Yorker's Richard Brody discusses Maryland Film Festival 2011
 "A Great Day in Baltimore" -- Filmmaker/Blogger Michael Tully discusses Maryland Film Festival 2011 for Indiewire
 New Yorker discusses Maryland Film Festival 2013
 "Weird and Wonderful" -- Artforum discusses Maryland Film Festival 2013
Parkway Theater - Explore Baltimore Heritage
 "Why I Am Hopeful": Programmer Eric Allen Hatch on the Future of Arthouse Programming in Filmmaker Magazine, June 2018

References

Film festivals in Maryland
Festivals in Baltimore
Film festivals established in 1999
1999 establishments in Maryland